The Diocese of Gospić–Senj is a diocese located in the cities of Gospić and Senj in the Ecclesiastical province of Rijeka in Croatia.

History
 May 25, 2000: Established as Diocese of Gospić – Senj from the Metropolitan Archdiocese of Rijeka–Senj

Special churches
Minor Basilicas:
 BVM Mother of Grace, Trsat, Primorje-Gorski Kotar
Former Cathedral:
 Katedrala Navijestenja Blažene Djevice Marije, Pićan, Istria(Cathedral of the Nativity of the Blessed Virgin Mary)
 Katedrala sv. Križ, Nin, Zadar(Cathedral of the Holy Cross)
 Katedrala sv. Marija, Osor, Primorje-Gorski Kotar (Cathedral of St. Mary)
 Katedrala sv. Marka, Modruš, Karlovac(Cathedral of St. Mark)
 Katedrala sv. Markova, Korčula, Dubrovnik-Neretva(Cathedral of St. Mark)
 Katedrala Uznesenja Blažene Djevice Marije, Rab, Primorje-Gorski Kotar(Cathedral of the Assumption of the Blessed Virgin Mary)

Leadership
 Bishops of Gospić–Senj (Roman rite)
 Bishop Mile Bogović (May 25, 2000 - April 4, 2016)
 Bishop Zdenko Križić, O.C.D. (April 4, 2016 – Present)

See also
Roman Catholicism in Croatia

Sources
 GCatholic.org
 Catholic Hierarchy
  Diocese website

Roman Catholic dioceses in Croatia
Christian organizations established in 2000
Roman Catholic dioceses and prelatures established in the 20th century
Gospić
Senj